Anadasmus pelinitis is a moth of the family Depressariidae. It is found in Colombia.

The wingspan is 34–38 mm. The forewings are light greyish-ochreous, more or less sprinkled with dark brown and with the costal edge ochreous-whitish. The stigmata are dark fuscous or blackish, the plical obliquely beyond the first discal. There is a cloudy fuscous transverse shade at three-fifths, strongly curved outwards in the disc around the second discal stigma. There is a similarly curved subterminal series of dark fuscous dots, as well as a series of dark fuscous dots around the apex and termen. The hindwings are whitish-ochreous, sometimes faintly tinged with fuscous.

References

Moths described in 1912
Anadasmus
Moths of South America